The 1988 German Formula Three Championship was a multi-event motor racing championship for single-seat open wheel formula racing cars held across Europe. The championship featured drivers competing in two-litre Formula Three racing cars which conformed to the technical regulations, or formula, for the championship. It commenced on 3 April at Zolder and ended at Hockenheim on 16 October after twelve rounds.

WTS Liqui Moly Equipe driver Joachim Winkelhock won the championship. He led the championship battle from the start of the season with a series of three consecutive wins. Otto Rensing lost seven points to Winkelhock and finished as runner-up with wins at Hockenheim and Nürburgring. Frank Biela won at Mainz Finthen and Hungaroring (the Hungarian track was in the schedule of German F3 for the first and the last time) and completed the top-three in the drivers' standings. Michael Bartels, Hanspeter Kaufmann and Wolfgang Kaufmann were the other race winners. Daniel Müller clinched the B-Cup championship title. The season was marred by the death of Csaba Kesjár in an accident at Norisring.

Teams and drivers
{|
|

Calendar

Results

Championship standings

A-Class
Points are awarded as follows:

References

External links
 

German Formula Three Championship seasons
Formula Three season